The Vineyard Race is an annual sailboat race hosted by the Stamford Yacht Club in Stamford, Connecticut. It is held every Labor Day weekend with the first start scheduled for Friday afternoon. A trophy award party is held on the Stamford Yacht Club lawn on Sunday afternoon.

The 238 nautical mile  race was started in 1932 and takes racers from Stamford east to Buzzards Bay and back. The first race had 23 starters with five finishers. The race has been held every year since its founding, except for three years during World War II.

It is also the final race of the Northern Ocean Racing Trophy series, the New England Lighthouse Series and the Doublehanded Ocean Racing Trophy.

In 1982, the race was described by Bob Bavier in Yachting as one of the "yachting classics." and:
The greatest distance races of the world have several things in common -- a challenging course, competitive fleets and an interesting array of famous yachts. By those standards, the Stamford Yacht Club's Vineyard Race rates close to the top. Like a miniature Fastnet, the Vineyard has a combination of coastal cruising, where currents play a big role, a stretch of ocean sailing, and a mark to round -- the Buzzards Bay tower -- before returning.

Course and records
In recent years the event expanded to three courses.  The course selection depends on the size and rating of the boat. There are divisions for double-handed boats as well as fully crewed boats. 
Vineyard Course - 238 nm 
Seaflower Reef Course - 143 nm 
Cornfield Point Course - 116 nm 

The Vinyard course records stand:
Overall: 14 hours, 53 minutes, and 55 seconds in 2020 - Argo MOD 70 Trimaran owned by Jason Carroll
Monohull: 17 hours, 42 minutes and 9 seconds in 2017 - WARRIOR Volvo 70 owned by the US Merchant Marine Academy Skippered by Stephen Murray, Jr.

The Vineyard Race Course is several races in one. Competitors must navigate Long Island Sound before passing into Block Island Sound through one of several narrow passages where there are tough tidal currents. After rounding the Buzzards Bay Entrance Light, they must leave Block Island to starboard before heading back into the Sound. A typical race involves a variety of conditions.

In 2022 the Stamford Yacht Club is scheduled to hold the 88th running of The Vineyard Race.

External links  
Stamford Yacht Club website
Race Registration Page

Sailing competitions in the United States
Recurring events established in 1932
Yachting races
Sailing in Connecticut